Izuru Takeuchi is a retired Japanese mixed martial artist who competed in the middleweight division.  He is a veteran of both the Pancrase and Shooto organizations, and is the former Middleweight King of Pancrase.  Outside of mixed martial arts, Takeuchi has competed in numerous grappling tournaments, most notably in the All-Japan Combat Wrestling Championships held by the National Amateur Combat Wrestling Association.

Championships and accomplishments

Grappling 
 A.D.C.C. Japan
2000 Abu Dhabi Japan Elimination Tournament: -87 kg Champion
 All Japan Combat Wrestling
2002 All Japan Combat Wrestling Championships: -85 kg Champion
2004 All Japan Combat Wrestling Championships: -85 kg Champion
 Combat Sambo World Championships
2005 Combat Sambo World Championships: 3rd place, -82 kg weight division

Mixed Martial Arts
 Pancrase
Middleweight King of Pancrase (One time)

Mixed martial arts record

| Loss
| align=center| 25-11-7
| Ichiro Kanai
| Decision (majority)
| Pancrase: Changing Tour 8
| 
| align=center| 3
| align=center| 5:00
| Tokyo, Japan
| 
|-
| Draw
| align=center| 25-10-7
| Takenori Sato
| Draw
| Pancrase: Changing Tour 4
| 
| align=center| 3
| align=center| 5:00
| Tokyo, Japan
| 
|-
| Loss
| align=center| 25-10-6
| Joe Doerksen
| TKO (punches)
| World Victory Road Presents: Sengoku 6
| 
| align=center| 3
| align=center| 4:13
| Saitama, Japan
| Middleweight Grand Prix Reserve bout
|-
| Win
| align=center| 25-9-6
| Junior Santos
| Submission (heel hook)
| Pancrase: Shining 5
| 
| align=center| 1
| align=center| 4:49
| Tokyo, Japan
| 
|-
| Win
| align=center| 24-9-6
| Hiromitsu Kanehara
| Decision (unanimous)
| Pancrase: Shining 2
| 
| align=center| 3
| align=center| 5:00
| Tokyo, Japan
| 
|-
| Win
| align=center| 23-9-6
| Yuichi Nakanishi
| Decision (unanimous)
| Pancrase: Rising 9
| 
| align=center| 3
| align=center| 5:00
| Tokyo, Japan
|  Won Middleweight King of Pancrase title. Later vacated the title.
|-
| Win
| align=center| 22-9-6
| Bryan Rafiq
| Decision (unanimous)
| Pancrase: Rising 6
| 
| align=center| 3
| align=center| 5:00
| Tokyo, Japan
| 
|-
| Win
| align=center| 21-9-6
| Daisuke Watanabe
| Decision (unanimous)
| Pancrase: Rising 4
| 
| align=center| 3
| align=center| 5:00
| Tokyo, Japan
| 
|-
| Loss
| align=center| 20-9-6
| Kyacey Uscola
| Decision (unanimous)
| Bodog Fight: Costa Rica Combat
| 
| align=center| 3
| align=center| 5:00
| Costa Rica
| 
|-
| Loss
| align=center| 20-8-6
| Yuichi Nakanishi
| Decision (split)
| Pancrase: Blow 10
| 
| align=center| 3
| align=center| 5:00
| Tokyo, Japan
|  For Middleweight King of Pancrase title
|-
| Win
| align=center| 20-7-6
| Hikaru Sato
| Decision (unanimous)
| Pancrase: Blow 6
| 
| align=center| 3
| align=center| 5:00
| Yokohama, Japan
| 
|-
| Loss
| align=center| 19-7-6
| Yushin Okami
| TKO (punches)
| Greatest Common Multiple: D.O.G. 6
| 
| align=center| 1
| align=center| 3:39
| Tokyo, Japan
| 
|-
| Win
| align=center| 19-6-6
| Azat Askerov
| Decision (unanimous)
| Pancrase: Blow 4
| 
| align=center| 2
| align=center| 5:00
| Tokyo, Japan
| 
|-
| Win
| align=center| 18-6-6
| Myung Ho Bae
| TKO (punches)
| MARS
| 
| align=center| 1
| align=center| 3:46
| Tokyo, Japan
| 
|-
| Win
| align=center| 17-6-6
| Kozo Urita
| Decision (unanimous)
| Pancrase: Spiral 9
| 
| align=center| 2
| align=center| 5:00
| Tokyo, Japan
| 
|-
| Win
| align=center| 16-6-6
| Hiromitsu Miura
| TKO (punches)
| K-1 Hero's 2
| 
| align=center| 2
| align=center| 2:35
| Tokyo, Japan
| 
|-
| Loss
| align=center| 15-6-6
| Nate Marquardt
| Technical Submission (rear-naked choke)
| Pancrase: Spiral 4
| 
| align=center| 3
| align=center| 2:19
| Yokohama, Japan
|  For Middleweight King of Pancrase title
|-
| Win
| align=center| 15-5-6
| Yuji Hisamatsu
| Decision (unanimous)
| Pancrase: Spiral 1
| 
| align=center| 3
| align=center| 5:00
| Tokyo, Japan
| 
|-
| Win
| align=center| 14-5-6
| Seiki Ryo
| TKO (shoulder injury)
| Pancrase: Brave 11
| 
| align=center| 1
| align=center| 5:00
| Tokyo, Japan
| 
|-
| Win
| align=center| 13-5-6
| Mitsuhiro Ito
| Submission (armlock)
| ARANAMI: Pre.Rough Sea
| 
| align=center| 2
| align=center| 2:35
| Niigata, Japan
| 
|-
| Draw
| align=center| 12-5-6
| Osami Shibuya
| Draw (unanimous)
| Pancrase: Brave 6
| 
| align=center| 3
| align=center| 5:00
| Tokyo, Japan
| 
|-
| Win
| align=center| 12-5-5
| Kiuma Kunioku
| Decision (majority)
| Pancrase: Brave 4
| 
| align=center| 3
| align=center| 5:00
| Tokyo, Japan
| 
|-
| Draw
| align=center| 11-5-5
| Marcel Ferreira
| Draw
| Absolute Fighting Championships 7
| 
| align=center| 3
| align=center| 5:00
| Fort Lauderdale, Florida, United States
| 
|-
| Draw
| align=center| 11-5-4
| Eiji Ishikawa
| Draw
| Pancrase: Hybrid 9
| 
| align=center| 3
| align=center| 5:00
| Tokyo, Japan
| 
|-
| Win
| align=center| 11-5-3
| Kosei Kubota
| Decision (unanimous)
| Pancrase: Hybrid 6
| 
| align=center| 3
| align=center| 5:00
| Tokyo, Japan
| 
|-
| Loss
| align=center| 10-5-3
| Nate Marquardt
| KO (punches)
| Pancrase: Hybrid 3
| 
| align=center| 1
| align=center| 1:29
| Tokyo, Japan
|  For Middleweight King of Pancrase title
|-
| Win
| align=center| 10-4-3
| Chris Lytle
| Decision (majority)
| Pancrase: Spirit 9
| 
| align=center| 3
| align=center| 5:00
| Tokyo, Japan
| 
|-
| Win
| align=center| 9-4-3
| Nate Marquardt
| Decision (unanimous)
| Pancrase: Spirit 7
| 
| align=center| 3
| align=center| 5:00
| Tokyo, Japan
| 
|-
| Loss
| align=center| 8-4-3
| Dustin Denes
| Decision (Unanimous)
| HOOKnSHOOT: New Wind
| 
| align=center| 3
| align=center| 5:00
| Evansville, Indiana, United States
| 
|-
| Win
| align=center| 8-3-3
| Ronald Jhun
| Decision (majority)
| Shooto: Treasure Hunt 1
| 
| align=center| 3
| align=center| 5:00
| Tokyo, Japan
| 
|-
| Draw
| align=center| 7-3-3
| Martijn de Jong
| Draw
| Shooto: To The Top 10
| 
| align=center| 3
| align=center| 5:00
| Tokyo, Japan
| 
|-
| Win
| align=center| 7-3-2
| Martijn de Jong
| Decision (split)
| Shooto: To The Top 6
| 
| align=center| 3
| align=center| 5:00
| Tokyo, Japan
| 
|-
| Loss
| align=center| 6-3-2
| Patrick Fortrie
| Decision
| Golden Trophy 2000
| 
| align=center| N/A
| align=center| N/A
| Orléans, France
| 
|-
| Win
| align=center| 6-2-2
| Frederique Ferrera
| Submission (armbar)
| Golden Trophy 2000
| 
| align=center| N/A
| align=center| N/A
| Orléans, France
| 
|-
| Win
| align=center| 5-2-2
| Florentim Amorim
| Decision
| Golden Trophy 2000
| 
| align=center| N/A
| align=center| N/A
| Orléans, France
| 
|-
| Win
| align=center| 4-2-2
| Shiko Yamashita
| Decision (unanimous)
| Shooto: R.E.A.D. 1
| 
| align=center| 2
| align=center| 5:00
| Tokyo, Japan
| 
|-
| Draw
| align=center| 3-2-2
| Ryuta Sakurai
| Decision (unanimous)
| Shooto: Gateway to the Extremes
| 
| align=center| 2
| align=center| 5:00
| Tokyo, Japan
| 
|-
| Win
| align=center| 3-2-1
| Ahmed Lazizi
| Decision (unanimous)
| Shooto: 10th Anniversary Event
| 
| align=center| 2
| align=center| 5:00
| Yokohama, Japan
| 
|-
| Win
| align=center| 2-2-1
| Nobuhiro Tsurumaki
| Decision (unanimous)
| Shooto: Gig '99
| 
| align=center| 2
| align=center| 5:00
| Tokyo, Japan
| 
|-
| Draw
| align=center| 1-2-1
| Ryuta Sakurai
| Draw
| Shooto: Las Grandes Viajes 6
| 
| align=center| 2
| align=center| 5:00
| Tokyo, Japan
| 
|-
| Loss
| align=center| 1–2
| Yuki Sasaki
| Decision (unanimous)
| Shooto: Gig '98 2nd
| 
| align=center| 2
| align=center| 5:00
| Tokyo, Japan
| 
|-
| Loss
| align=center| 1–1
| Masanori Suda
| Submission (toe hold)
| Lumax Cup: Tournament of J '97 Middleweight Tournament
| 
| align=center| 1
| align=center| 1:53
| Japan
| 
|-
| Win
| align=center| 1-0
| Motohiko Sugiyama
| Decision (unanimous)
| Lumax Cup: Tournament of J '97 Middleweight Tournament
| 
| align=center| 2
| align=center| 3:00
| Japan
| MMA Debut.

See also
List of male mixed martial artists
List of Pancrase champions

References

External links
 
Izuru Takeuchi, Pancrase profile

1974 births
Living people
Sportspeople from Okayama
Japanese male mixed martial artists
Middleweight mixed martial artists
Mixed martial artists utilizing sambo
Mixed martial artists utilizing judo
Japanese male judoka
Japanese sambo practitioners